Fafard is a surname of French origin. Notable people with this name include:
 Adine Fafard-Drolet (1876–1963), Canadian singer and founder of a conservatory
 Fernand Fafard (1882–1955), member of the Canadian House of Commons
 Joe Fafard (1942–2019), Canadian sculptor
 Joel Fafard (born 1968), Canadian guitarist
 Patrick Fafard (born 1960), Canadian university professor